Jeannie Longo (born 31 October 1958 in Annecy, Haute-Savoie) is a French racing cyclist, 25-time French champion and 13-time world champion. Longo began racing in 1975 and was active in cycling through 2012. She was once widely considered the best female cyclist of all time, although that reputation is now clouded by suspicion of doping throughout her career. She is famous for her competitive nature and her longevity in the sport — when she was selected to compete for France in the 2008 Olympics, it was her seventh Olympic Games; some of Longo's competitors that year had not yet been born when she took part in her first Olympics in 1984. She had stated that 2008 would be her final participation in the Olympics.
In the Women's road race, she finished 24th, 33 seconds behind winner Nicole Cooke, who was one year old when Longo first rode in the Olympics.
At the same Olympics, she finished 4th in the road time trial, just two seconds shy of securing a bronze medal. She is currently number two on the all-time list of French female summer or winter Olympic medal winners, with a total of four medals including one in gold, which is one less than the total number won by the fencer Laura Flessel-Colovic.

Career

Longo was born in Annecy, Haute-Savoie, in the French Alps where she began her athletic career as a downhill skier. After winning the French schools' ski championship and three university skiing championships, she switched to cycling at the urging of her coach (and later husband) Patrice Ciprelli. Within a few months, Longo won the French road race Championship at the age of 21. She competed both in road and track bicycle racing events, and is an Olympic gold-medalist and thirteen-time world champion.

Doping affairs
In September 1987 Longo tested positive for ephedrine following a 3 km world record attempt in Colorado Springs.  She served a 1-month ban for this offense.

In September 2011, it was reported that Longo had missed three doping tests and was under investigation by the FFC. Normally, this would be penalized the same as a positive test, but AFLD had failed to notify Longo that she would be targeted for testing in that year, so this resulted in them letting her off. It subsequently transpired that Longo's husband, Patrice Ciprelli, had purchased the performance-enhancing drug EPO from China via former American professional cyclist Joe Papp.  Ciprelli confessed and claimed that he purchased the EPO for his own personal use. He was found guilty in May 2016, and given a 1 year suspended jail sentence and  €12,800 in fines and costs.

Palmarès

Track

Note: Beginning in 1997, the Union Cycliste Internationale awarded points to riders based on their performances. For this purpose, the races were classified. Although the system has evolved, the major stage races are category 1 (strongest) and 2. In the listings below, these categories, where known, are in parentheses. GC stands for general classification.

1981
3rd UCI Track World Championship (Individual pursuit)
1982
3rd UCI Track World Championship (Individual pursuit)
1983
2nd Summer Universiade Track Championship (Individual pursuit)
3rd UCI Track World Championship (Individual pursuit)
1984
2nd UCI Track World Championship (Individual pursuit)
1985
2nd UCI Track World Championship (Individual pursuit)
1986
1st  UCI Track World Championship (Individual pursuit)
1987
2nd UCI Track World Championship (Individual pursuit)
1988
1st  UCI Track World Championship (Individual pursuit)
1989
1st  UCI Track World Championship (Points race)
1st  UCI Track World Championship (Individual pursuit)
1998
1st  French Track Pursuit Championships

Mountainbike
1993
2nd UCI Mountain Bike Championship

Road

1979
1st  French Road Race Championship
1980
1st  French Road Race Championship
1981
1st  French Road Race Championship
2nd  World Road Race Championships
1982
1st  French Road Race Championship
1983
1st  French Road Race Championship
3rd Summer Universiade Road Race Championship 
1984
1st  French Road Race Championship
1985
1st  World Road Race Championships
1st  French Road Race Championship
1986
1st  World Road Race Championships
1st  French Road Race Championship
1987
1st  World Road Race Championships
1st  French Road Race Championship
1988
1st  French Road Race Championship
1989
1st  World Road Race Championships
1st  French Road Race Championship
1992
2nd Olympic Road Race
1st  French Road Race Championship
1993
2nd  World Road Race Championships
1995
1st  World Road Race Championships
1st  French Road Race Championship
1st Overall Emakumeen Bira
1996
1st Olympic Road Race
1997
1st  World Time Trial Championships
1st Grand Prix des Nations Time Trial 
1st Overall Trophée d'Or Féminin
2 Stage victories
1st Overall Tour du Canton de Conques
 2 Stage victories
2nd Overall Vuelta a Majorca
1 Stage victory
3rd Overall Interreg-Dreilaender Damen Tour 
3rd Overall Trois Jours de Vendee
7th UCI Points list
1998
1st  French Road Race Championship
1st 1 Stage Trois Jours de Vendee
1st Mt. Evans Hill Climb (course record)
2nd Montreal World Cup
3rd French Road CCT
3rd Overall Trophée d'Or Féminin
3rd Overall Canberra Cycling Classic (Tour de Snowy)
1 Stage victory
3rd Overall Tour of Aquitaine
1 Stage victory
4th Overall Women's Challenge
5th World Time Trial Championships
9th World Road Race Championships
10th UCI Points list
2000
1st Mount Washington Auto Road Bicycle Hillclimb (Course record)
3rd Olympic Time Trial
2001
1st  World Time Trial Championships
3rd World Road Race Championships
9th Overall Grande Boucle Féminine
5th Overall Women's Challenge 
1st Mountains classification
1 Stage victory
6th Montréal World Cup
6th Grand prix de Haute-Garonne
2002
3rd Chrono Champenois-Trophée Européen
7th World Time Trial Championships
2003
6th World Time Trial Championship
6th World Road Race Championship
2004
10th Olympic Games Road Race
1st  French Road Race Championship
2005
2nd Chrono Champenois
1st  French Road Race Championship
1st  French Time Trial Championship
2007
7th World Time Trial Championship
2008
1st  French Road Race Championship
1st  French Time Trial Championship
1st Mt. Evans Hill Climb
4th Olympic Games Time Trial
2009
1st Trophée des Grimpeurs, women's.
1st  French Time Trial Championship
1st Chrono des Nations
3rd Overall Fitchburg Longsjo Classic
2010
1st  French Time Trial Championship
1st Chrono des Nations
3rd French National Road Race Championship
2011
1st Pikes Peak Hillclimb
1st  French Time Trial Championship

See also
 List of athletes with the most appearances at Olympic Games
 List of doping cases in cycling

References

External links

 Jeannie Longo's web site (in French language only)
 Some cycling records
 

1958 births
Living people
Sportspeople from Annecy
French female cyclists
French people of Italian descent
UCI Road World Champions (women)
Cyclists at the 1984 Summer Olympics
Cyclists at the 1988 Summer Olympics
Cyclists at the 1992 Summer Olympics
Cyclists at the 1996 Summer Olympics
Cyclists at the 2000 Summer Olympics
Cyclists at the 2004 Summer Olympics
Cyclists at the 2008 Summer Olympics
Olympic cyclists of France
Olympic gold medalists for France
Olympic silver medalists for France
Olympic bronze medalists for France
Cross-country mountain bikers
Olympic medalists in cycling
Medalists at the 1992 Summer Olympics
Medalists at the 1996 Summer Olympics
Medalists at the 2000 Summer Olympics
UCI Track Cycling World Champions (women)
Universiade medalists in cycling
French track cyclists
Universiade silver medalists for France
Medalists at the 1983 Summer Universiade
Cyclists from Auvergne-Rhône-Alpes